Bookhouse may refer to:

 A repository for books
 A book design and typesetting company located in Sydney, Australia
 The Bookhouse Boys, a secret society on the American television serial drama Twin Peaks
 A band from Winston-Salem, NC, consisting of brothers Joshua and Aaron Brookshire.
 The Book House for Children, a 6-volume children's book set edited by Olive Beaupre Miller, which began publication in 1921.
 The Book House, a building complex in Moscow designed like an open book